In the Persian epic of Shahnameh Div-e Sepid (lit. White Demon), is the chieftain of the Divs (demons) of Mazandaran. He is a huge being. He possesses great physical strength and is skilled in sorcery and necromancy. He destroys the army of Kay Kavus by conjuring a dark storm of hail, boulders, and tree trunks using his magical skills. He then captures Kay Kavus, his commanders, and paladins; blinds them, and imprisons them in a dungeon. The greatest Persian mythical hero Rostam undertakes his "Seven Labors" to free his sovereign. At the end, Rostam slays Div-e Sepid and uses his heart and blood to cure the blindness of the king and the captured Persian heroes. Rostam also takes the Div's head as a helmet and is often pictured wearing it.

In the Shabrangnama 
In the Shabrangnama it is revealed that the white demon sired a son.

Alternative views 
It is written in the Journal of the Royal Central Asian Society that the struggle between Rostam and the white demon represents a struggle between Iranians and invaders from the north, from the Caspian provinces.

The Div-e Sepid is believed by Joseph J. Reed to have been a northern prince. Warner believes that he is a personification of the Mazandaranians, who were believed to have skin of an unhealthily pale colour caused by the climate of their homeland Some scholars hold the opinion that these divs of Mazandaran are merely wild people of the forest. Others are of the opinion that they are a group of enemy kings of ancient Mazandaran (which might have been different from its modern location) and Tabaristan. Alexander Krappe theorized that Ahriman himself was believed to have white skin. P. Molesworth Sykes believes that the name "White Div" represents a white nation.

According to one source Zal spoke of the horrid race of white-skinned people. This however contradicts with the fact that Zal was an albino himself. Zal means albino in Persian language.

References

External links

Demons
Daevas
Persian literature
Persian mythology
Shahnameh characters